TSV may refer to:

 Tab-separated values, an example of delimiter-separated values
 Two-step verification
 Through-silicon via, a vertical electrical connection passing completely through the silicon substrate of a wafer or die
 Time Space Visualiser, a Doctor Who fanzine
 Taura syndrome virus
 Tobacco streak virus, a plant pathogenic virus
 Townsville Airport (IATA code), a major Australian regional airport
 TSV (TV channel), a TV channel in the unrecognized state of Transnistria
 Turn- und Sportverein ("Gymnastics and Sports club"), a common club name prefix of sports in Germany and Austria
 Transport Stream Video, a video file format as in MPEG transport stream